General elections were held in Aruba on 8 January 1993. The Aruban People's Party and People's Electoral Movement (MEP) both won nine seats in the 21-seat Estates. The MEP remained in government with a three-party coalition headed by Nelson Oduber as Prime Minister.

Results

References

Elections in Aruba
Aruba
1993 in Aruba
January 1993 events